Pedro Miguel Gonçalves Simões (born 5 February 1999) is a Portuguese professional footballer who plays for Esperança de Lagos as a midfielder.

Football career
On 16 December 2018, Simões made his professional debut with Farense in a 2018–19 LigaPro match against Estoril Praia. On 9 January 2020, Simões joined CF Esperança Lagos on loan for the rest of the season.

References

External links

1999 births
Living people
People from Albufeira
Portuguese footballers
Association football midfielders
Liga Portugal 2 players
Campeonato de Portugal (league) players
S.C. Farense players
Sportspeople from Faro District